Guimaras's at-large congressional district is the provincewide electoral district in Guimaras, Philippines. It was created ahead of the 1995 Philippine House of Representatives elections following its conversion into a regular province under the 1991 Local Government Code (Republic Act No. 7160) which was ratified in a 1992 plebiscite concurrent with that year's general election. Guimaras had been a sub-province of Iloilo since 1966 and was last represented as part of Iloilo's 2nd district in the House of Representatives from 1987 to 1995 and in earlier national legislatures from 1907 to 1972. It was also formerly included in the multi-member Region VI's at-large district for the Interim Batasang Pambansa from 1978 to 1984 and the multi-member Iloilo's at-large district for the Malolos Congress from 1898 to 1899 and for the Regular Batasang Pambansa from 1984 to 1986. The district is currently represented in the 18th Congress by Maria Lucille Nava of the PDP–Laban.

Representation history

Election results

2022

2019

2016

2013

2010

See also
Legislative districts of Guimaras

References

Congressional districts of the Philippines
Politics of Guimaras
1995 establishments in the Philippines
At-large congressional districts of the Philippines
Congressional districts of Western Visayas
Constituencies established in 1991